Gymnastics at the World Games 2009.

Gymnastics has been part of all World Games. Among the disciplines, there are rhythmic gymnastics, trampolining and tumbling as well as acrobatics and aerobics. Artistic gymnastics are not contested at the World Games because all of its disciplines have always been Olympic sports.

Medalists

Acrobatic gymnastics

Aerobic gymnastics

Rhythmic gymnastics (women's individual)

Trampoline

Tumbling

See also
 Gymnastics at the World Games

References

 
 

2009 World Games
Gymnastics at the World Games
2009 in gymnastics